Vampiro: Angel, Devil, Hero  is a 2008 Canadian documentary film about Ian Hodgkinson aka  Vampiro, a professional wrestler who currently lives in Guadalajara, Jalisco. The film revolves around his biggest international tour and talks to him about life outside the ring.

Release
Vampiro has screened at the Monterrey International Film Festival, the Austin Film Festival and the Kingston Canadian Film Festival.

Awards
Vampiro won the Best Editing award at the Monterrey Int'l Film Festival and was ranked among the Top 10 Must See Movies by the Austin Film Festival.

External links 
 
 
 

2008 films
Professional wrestling documentary films
Canadian documentary films
Documentary films about entertainers
2008 documentary films
2000s English-language films
2000s Canadian films